Dolnji Ajdovec (in older sources Dolenja Ajdovica) is a village in the Municipality of Žužemberk in southeastern Slovenia. The area is part of the historical region of Lower Carniola. The municipality is now included in the Southeast Slovenia Statistical Region. 

The local parish church is dedicated to the Holy Trinity and belongs to the Roman Catholic Diocese of Novo Mesto. It was built in the 1990s.

References

External links
Dolnji Ajdovec at Geopedia

Populated places in the Municipality of Žužemberk